European Polymer Journal is a monthly peer-reviewed scientific journal, established in 1965 and published by Elsevier. The journal is publishing both original research and review papers on topic of the physics and chemistry of polymers. In 2006, it launched the polymer nanotechnology section.
Prof. Richard Hoogenboom, from Ghent University, is the editor-in-chief of the journal.

References

Chemistry journals
Materials science journals
Elsevier academic journals